Lorenz Theodor Biegler is the professor of Covestro University Professor, in the Chemical Engineering department at Carnegie Mellon University. He was previously the Department head of Chemical Engineering at Carnegie Mellon from 2013-2018. His research interests lie in optimization of differential and algebraic systems, computer aided process engineering (CAPE), reactor network synthesis, and algorithms for constrained, nonlinear process control.
He has written two widely used textbooks, and over 400 scientific publications.

Work
In 1985 Biegler was awarded the Presidential Young Investigator Award, which lead to him starting the Center for Advanced Process Decision-Making at Carnegie Mellon University, along with Ignacio Grossmann and Art Westerberg. Biegler has played a major role in the computer aided process engineering, has received various awards including the Computing in Chemical Engineering Award from the American Institute of Chemical Engineers, an honorary doctorate from the Technical University of Berlin, the INFORMS Computing Society Prize for developing IPOPT, an open source program for large-scale nonlinear optimization.

Biegler was elected a member of the National Academy of Engineering in 2013 for contributing to large-scale nonlinear optimization theory and algorithms for application to process optimization, design and control.

References

External links
Google scholar profile

Year of birth missing (living people)
Living people
Place of birth missing (living people)
American chemical engineers
Carnegie Mellon University faculty
University of Wisconsin–Madison College of Engineering alumni
Illinois Institute of Technology alumni